Cochabamba Municipality is the only municipal section of the Cercado Province in the Cochabamba Department, Bolivia. Its seat is Cochabamba.

Subdivision
Cochabamba Municipality is divided into one canton.

See also 
 Cochabamba

References 

Municipalities of the Cochabamba Department